Phineas Warren Hitchcock (November 30, 1831July 10, 1881) was an American Delegate and a Senator from Nebraska. Hitchcock County, Nebraska, is named after him.

Early life 
He was born in New Lebanon, Columbia County, New York, the son of Gad Hitchcock and Nancy Prime. When he turned 16, he began two years preparatory course study at the Great Barrington Academy in Great Barrington, Massachusetts. 

He entered Williams College in Williamstown, Massachusetts graduating in 1855. His classmates at Williams included, James A. Garfield, James Gilfillan and John James Ingalls. After he graduated, and after several years of combined law study and journalistic work in New York State, he moved to the Territory of Nebraska in the spring of 1857, locating at Omaha, then a small settlement.

Career 
Once in Nebraska, Hitchcock opened a law office, combining with the practice of his profession an agency for several insurance companies and a general real estate business.

Political career

Hitchcock was appointed a United States Marshal from 1861 to 1864; a Republican, elected as the Nebraska Territory Delegate to the Thirty-ninth Congress and served from March 4, 1865 to March 1, 1867, when the Territory was admitted as a State into the Union. He was appointed surveyor general of Nebraska and Iowa from 1867 to 1869. In 1870, Hitchcock was elected as a Republican to the United States Senate and served from March 4, 1871, to March 3, 1877. He was an unsuccessful candidate for reelection.

Hitchcock served as the chairman of the Committee on Territories in the Forty-fourth Congress. He was involved in newspaper publishing and various businesses.

In 1873 Hitchcock introduced the Timber Culture Act a follow-up act to the Homestead Act. The Timber Culture Act was passed by Congress on March 3 of that year. This act allowed homesteaders to acquire 160 acres of land by planting 40 acres of trees. At the end of eight years from the date of entry, the settler could make final proof if the necessary conditions had been fulfilled. Five additional years were allowed to make proof, or a total of thirteen years from the date of entry. The claimant had to prove that the trees had been planted and cultivated and that not less than 675 living trees per acre had survived. An affidavit or "timber culture proof" had to be completed by the claimant and two witnesses before the final certificate and patents were issued.

Personal life 
He married on December 27, 1858, at Omaha, Nebraska, Annie M. Monell, the daughter of Lucinda Carpenter and Dr. Gilbert C. Monell, an 1839 graduate of the Columbia University College of Physicians and Surgeons and a member of the Old Settlers' Association. She was born in 1837 in Newburgh, New York and died in 1877 in Omaha, Nebraska. She is buried in Prospect Hill Cemetery.

They were the parents of three children, all born at Omaha, Nebraska: Gilbert M. Hitchcock, born September 18, 1859 and the founder of the Omaha World-Herald and a U.S. Representative and Senator; Grace Hitchcock, born September 20, 1862 and John Gray Hitchcock, born April 29, 1865.

Notes

References

|-

1831 births
1881 deaths
19th-century American lawyers
19th-century American politicians
American people of English descent
Burials at Prospect Hill Cemetery (North Omaha, Nebraska)
Delegates to the United States House of Representatives from Nebraska Territory
Nebraska lawyers
Nebraska Republicans
People from New Lebanon, New York
Republican Party United States senators from Nebraska
United States Marshals
Williams College alumni